, known professionally as , is a Japanese singer and voice actress. She is a member of Metamuse and a former member of Hello! Project idol group Angerme and Shugo Chara Egg!.

Biography

Hello!Pro Egg
Fukuda Kanon joined Hello!Project as a member of Hello! Pro Egg in June 2004 when she passed the auditions alongside thirty-two other girls. In November, Kanon received a role in a musical as "Henrika" in the production Miracle on 34th Street.

Kanon worked on the Niseen Hikosen Project 2006 campaign single "Sora ga Aru" with three other Hello! Pro Egg members. She performed in three musicals in 2007, playing "Mao" in "Chitose Zuki" in March, performing "Saien!! Chitose Zuki" in August and "Heisei Revolution ~Bakku Tuze – Byakkotai~" in October.

Kanon also took part in television, "Chao.TV" (started 2007/09/02). Kanon had another role in a musical in 2008, that being "Bijogi Junction" in April, but a bigger opportunity for Kanon presented itself when she was selected to be one of the four members for a new Hello! Pro Egg unit alongside Yuuka Maeda, Ayaka Wada and Akari Saho. The group was called Shugo Chara Egg! and was formed to record the opening themes for the anime Shugo Chara!

Smileage and Angerme
On April 4, 2009, Tsunku announced on his blog that a new group was in the works. The members announced were Kanon Fukuda, Yuuka Maeda and Ayaka Wada, all formerly of Shugo Chara Egg!, and fellow Hello! Pro Egg member Saki Ogawa. On May 5, 2009, Tsunku revealed the name of the new group to be "S/mileage" on his blog.
Kanon was later cast in a film with Yajima Maimi of °C-ute, titled "Fuyu no Kaidan."
Kanon was also chosen to be a member of Shin Minimoni, the revival of Hello! Project group Minimoni.
In August 2009, she also took part in Shugo Chara! The Musical alongside fellow S/mileage members Yuuka Maeda and Meimi Tamura and played the part of Nadeshiko Fujisaki.

Kanon and the rest of the S/mileage members graduated from Hello! Pro Egg in the Hello! Project spring concert in May. 
She and fellow S/mileage members, Yuuka Maeda and Ayaka Wada were later chosen to be the lead voice actors for the anime Hime Chen! Otogi Chikku Idol Lilpri!

Prior to Linlin's graduation from Morning Musume, Kanon became the leader of Shin Minimoni.

On May 20, 2015, Kanon announced her graduation from ANGERME and Hello! Project, which will take place in the fall of 2015.

Discography

Filmography

References

External links 
 Official personal blog
 

Angerme members
Japanese voice actresses
Japanese idols
Japanese lyricists
Minimoni members
Voice actresses from Saitama (city)
Living people
1995 births
Musicians from Saitama Prefecture